Kavathe is a village located in Shirur Taluka of the Pune district of Maharashtra state. The village adds the name of local hindu goddess 'Yemai' for distinguishing from other villages in Maharashtra with similar name. Kavathe is known for it historical link with Maratha Empire and because of various folk art & artiste associated with Tamasha, drama, Jagaran-Gondhal and Bharud. Poet Bashir Momin Kavathekar and Dholak performer Shri Gangaram Bua are the two prominent folk artiste who had brought laurels with their notable contribution to the Maharashtra's performing art, culture and traditional art form Tamasha. Vithabai Bhau Mang Narayangaonkar's grandfather Shri Narayan Khude who formed his own Tamasha Troupe was also from Kavathe Yamai.

History 

The village later moved to its current location when Maratha General Anand Rao I Pawar, of the Dhar State, built a walled city there. The village became politically important after the construction of a palace. Cultural and historical landmarks include the palace built by the Pawar dynasty in the 18th century, as well as various temples in Hemadpanthi architectural style. The city was once walled, but the expansion of the village borders to allow for increased habitation has caused the surrounding walls, and huge gates to crumble. The village is famous for the Yemai Temple, Fatteshwar Temple, and Sayamba Temple. The temples' land and trust are owned by the Gore Patil family, who were Patil of the village for some time. They manage all economic affairs of the trust. Many followers visit the Kavathe seeking blessings, and to participate in the annual anniversary (Yatra.)

The Fatteshwar Temple has historical importance as it was built by Anand Rao Pawar after the Marathas defeated Nizam Ul Mulk of Hyderabad. The word Fatte literally means "victory." It is situated on the confluence of a stream locally known as Khar Odha and the river Ghodnadi.

Geography and climate
Kavathe is surrounded by Parner Taluka, Khed Taluka, Ambegaon Taluka, and Junnar Taluka. The village is well connected with Manchar, Shirur, and Pune.
The village is located in the rain shadow area of the Sahyadris. It has an arid climate, irrigation from the river Ghod, and from wells serve most of the village. Crops include sugar cane, bajra, groundnuts and pomegranates.

Demography
Hinduism (90% of the population) is the largest religion, followed by other religions such as Islam, Buddhism, Jainism. Sects/religions coexist in peaceful manner participating in each other's celebrations/ functions. Major castes are Dhangar and Marathas, both of whom share similar agriculturally-based livelihoods. Common family names include Mukhekar, Bhor, Ichake, Kandalkar, Wagdare, Pokale, Sandbhor, Ghode, Yede, Ughade.

Administration

Shri Ramchandra Sandbhor currently holds a position as sarpanch of village Panchayat. The village comes under Shirur constituency for Loksabha and under Ambegaon constituency for Vidhansabha.

Education
The village has a primary school (run by Zilla Parishad) established in 1866, Higher Secondary School & College (run by Rayat Shikshan Sanstha) and a few more recently founded English medium schools.

Culture
The beautifully constructed Hemadpanthi style temples include Vithhal Temple, Ganesh Temple, Mahadev Temple, Hanuman Temple. The Yamai temple, Saymaba Temple, Datta temple, and Fatteshwar temple are the most prominent. Yamai temple is located to the west of the village. This village takes its name from its Yamai goddess. Annual festivals/Yatra are organized by villages where many devote from all over Maharashtra participate.. The Kojagiri Pornima is celebrated with Palakhi procession followed by a Bhajan-Kirtan and a Drama for entertainment. The village has a beautiful temple of Bhagavan Mahavir (Jain Temple). There is a Mosque & four Peer Durgahs which are managed by local Muslim Community.

Performing arts
The people in the village are very supportive of the art/literature/theaters. Tamasha artist Mr Gangaram Bua was awarded a national prize for playing the Dholak. He was awarded Vithabai Narayangaonkar Jeevan Gaurav Puraskar by the state government for his service to the field of Tamasha in 2016.  Famous tamasha troupes like Narayan Khude (continued by Bhau Bapu Narayangaonkar & then Vithabai Bhau Mang Narayangaonkar); Baburao Kavathekar  and Surekha Punekar has their origins here. The amateur theatre groups from Kavathe has staged the play 'Bhangale Swapn Maharashtra' written by Bashir Momin Kavathekar all over Maharashtra & Goa during 1980s.

See also
 Shirur, Maharashtra

References

External links 

 https://shodhganga.inflibnet.ac.in/handle/10603/3772?mode=full
 https://www.shirurtaluka.com/index.php?shr=from-town&thgid=2995
 https://lokpatra.in/index.php/archives/23160

Villages in Pune district